Beast (Dr. Henry Philip "Hank" McCoy) is a superhero appearing in American comic books published by Marvel Comics and is a founding member of the X-Men. Originally called "The Beast", the character was introduced as a mutant possessing ape-like superhuman physical strength and agility, oversized hands and feet, a genius-level intellect, and otherwise normal appearance and speech. Eventually being referred to simply as "Beast", Hank McCoy underwent progressive physiological transformations, gaining animalistic physical characteristics. These include blue fur, both simian and feline facial features, pointed ears, fangs, and claws. Beast's physical strength and senses increased to even greater levels.

Despite Hank McCoy's feral appearance, he is depicted as a brilliant, well-educated man in the arts and sciences, known for his witty sense of humor, and characteristically uses barbed witticisms with long words and intellectual references to distract his foes. He is a world authority on biochemistry and genetics, the X-Men's medical doctor, and the science and mathematics instructor at the Xavier Institute (the X-Men's headquarters and school for young mutants). He is also a mutant political activist, campaigning against society's bigotry and discrimination against mutants. While fighting his own bestial instincts and fears of social rejection, Beast dedicates his physical and mental gifts to the creation of a better world for man and mutant.

One of the original X-Men, Beast has appeared regularly in X-Men-related comics since his debut. He has also been a member of the Avengers and Defenders.

The character has also appeared in media adaptations, including animated TV series and feature films. In X2 (2003), Steve Bacic portrayed him in a brief cameo in his human appearance while in X-Men: The Last Stand (2006) the character had a larger role and was played by Kelsey Grammer. Nicholas Hoult portrayed a younger version of the character in X-Men: First Class (2011). Both Hoult and Grammer reprised their roles in X-Men: Days of Future Past (2014). Hoult also reprised the role in X-Men: Apocalypse (2016) and Dark Phoenix (2019), and had a cameo in Deadpool 2 (2018).

Publication history
Created by writer Stan Lee and artist/co-writer Jack Kirby, the character first appeared in X-Men #1 (September 1963). Stan Lee writes in the foreword to X-Men: The Ultimate Guide that he made Beast the most articulate, eloquent, and well-read of the X-Men to contrast with his brutish exterior. Further, the book opines that the Werner Roth–Roy Thomas team garnered admiration for their "appealing and sensitive characterizations of the original X-Men". Roth, under the alias Jay Gavin, had taken over for Kirby fully by issue #18, and Thomas was a new talent. Beast was given an individualized, colorful new costume, along with the rest of the X-Men by issue #39 to attract new readers. During Jim Steranko's tenure, which added "exciting art", Roth returned, working with Neal Adams who blended Kirby's style with "realism, idealized beauty, and epic grandeur".

In Amazing Adventures #11 (March 1972), written by Gerry Conway, Beast underwent a radical change and mutated into his now familiar furry, blue (originally grey) appearance. The concept originated with Roy Thomas, an effort to make the character more visibly striking, and Beast also became more werewolf-like to capitalize on the success of Werewolf by Night. Steve Englehart, who wrote the remainder of the Beast's short-lived spotlight in Amazing Adventures, emphasized the character's wit rather than the tragedy of his transformation into a more monstrous form, reasoning that the Beast's intelligence and sense of humor would allow him to see his misfortune in perspective. Over the next decade the Beast would appear on the roster of several teams in titles ranging from The Avengers to The Defenders to X-Factor. It was not until 1991, in X-Factor #70/X-Men #1, that the Beast finally returned to the X-Men.

Englehart later said that he added the Beast to the Avengers roster because he wanted to write the character again and thought his funny, down-to-earth personality would make him a good foil for Moondragon. Succeeding writers of The Avengers similarly found that the character's lightheartedness made a good balance to the team's generally serious tone, resulting in the Beast's run in The Avengers outlasting his earlier run in X-Men. His friendship with fellow Avenger Wonder Man would likewise come to eclipse his friendship with X-Man Iceman for the comics fandom. The Avengers #137 (July 1975) debuted the Beast's catchphrase, "Oh, my stars and garters," and The Avengers #164 (October 1977) was the first to depict him as a sex symbol, a take which writer Jim Shooter said resulted in very positive mail from female readers in particular.

Beast cured the Legacy Virus in The Uncanny X-Men #390 (2001), and in X-Treme X-Men #3 (2001) he experienced a further mutation into a feline being, first shown in the introduction to New X-Men (June, 2001), by Frank Quitely and Grant Morrison. As evidenced on the back cover of X-Treme X-Men Chris Claremont, writer of that series in addition to both The Uncanny X-Men (for sixteen consecutive years) and X-Factor, contributed much to the Beast's characterization. Citing Claremont as inspiration for his run on New X-Men, Morrison explains Beast as a "brilliant, witty bipolar scientist". Morrison continues, "I saw Henry McCoy as an incredibly clever, witty, cultured, well-traveled, experienced, well-read character so I brought out those parts of his personality which seemed to me to fit the profiles of the smartest and most worldly people I know—his sense of humor is dark and oblique. He's obviously quite clearly bipolar and swings between manic excitement and ghastly self-doubt. He has no dark secrets, however, and nothing to hide."

Joss Whedon's "Astonishing X-Men: Gifted" story arc featured a "mutant cure" designed by Indian Benetech scientist Dr. Kavita Rao, and the prospect of "real" humanity arouses the interest of a heavily mutated Beast, who visits Rao only to discover that the drug is the product of illegal human experimentation on an unknown victim. The idea of a mutant cure, which had previously appeared in the 1992 animated series, was also the basis of the X-Men: The Last Stand movie plot and the series was even made into a motion comic. IGN called the arc focusing on Beast "best X-Men run in a decade" and lauded Whedon for flawless character dynamics. According to BusinessWeek, Beast is listed as one of the top ten most intelligent fictional characters in American comics.

Beast appeared as a regular character throughout the 2010–2013 Secret Avengers series, from issue #1 (July 2010) through its final issue #37 (March 2013).

Fictional character biography

Youth
Henry Philip "Hank" McCoy was born in Dundee, Illinois, in the United States, to Norton and Edna McCoy. His father, Norton McCoy, is employed at a local nuclear power plant before Henry's birth and was once exposed to intense nuclear radiation, which appears to have caused his son's mutation. Hank is born with a vast intellect, unusually long arms and legs, and unusually large hands and feet—a rare although not unique case of mutant powers manifesting before puberty. His bodily proportions are comparable to those of a gorilla, and later stories reveal his nickname in school was "Magilla Gorilla".

With the X-Men
Henry's mutation more fully manifests during adolescence, providing greater strength and agility, and although his powers allow him to briefly excel in athletics during his remaining time at school, he soon attracts the animosity of his fellow students and other non-mutant humans. As he seeks refuge, he is approached by Professor Charles Xavier, who invites him to study at Xavier's School for Gifted Youngsters.

Henry recognizes the opportunities such an institution can offer him and accepts the invitation. He finds the school both a fountain of scientific knowledge and a place of sanctuary. There he is introduced to the X-Men, who accept him into their ranks and give him the codename Beast. Alongside workouts in the Danger Room, under Xavier's tutelage, he studies subjects ranging from differential equations to Proust.

With the rest of the X-Men on their first field mission, he battles Magneto for the first time, and later Magneto's Brotherhood of Evil Mutants. He became stressed because he had to keep a secret identity while in the X-Men team, so he briefly left the team to become a professional wrestler. While he was a professional wrestler he met Unus the Untouchable, and helped the X-Men build a directed-energy weapon to make Unus completely untouchable, resulting in Unus not being able to feed himself. Beast then rejoined the X-Men team. With the team, he also visits the Savage Land, and meets Ka-Zar. Beast battles the Juggernaut, but he is badly hurt. He subsequently fights the Sentinels with the X-Men, and he and Iceman battle the Maha Yogi. Hank later recounts his clash with the Conquistador and how he joined the X-Men.

Furry change and team trading
Hank is the first to leave the X-Men. He becomes a research scientist at the Brand Corporation, a genetics research facility. His assistant, Linda Donaldson, becomes his girlfriend. Hank isolates a "hormonal extract" allowing anyone to become a mutant for a short period of time, and uses the mutagenic serum on himself to disguise his appearance while foiling an attempt to steal his research. He waits too long to reverse the process, leaving him permanently transformed. He grows grey fur, which later turns blue, all over his body and acquires pointed ears, elongated canine teeth, claws, the ability to run on walls and ceilings like a spider, enhanced senses, an accelerated healing factor, and a feral side he struggles to control. He briefly joins the Brotherhood of Evil Mutants when Mastermind wipes out his memory, but quickly recovers. When Beast is wounded, he is aided by Patsy Walker, and then reunited with his old girlfriend, Vera Cantor. He fears that his furry form will repulse others, but finds that many women are attracted to his hirsuteness. Back at Brand Laboratories, he discovers his girlfriend Linda Donaldson is an agent of the criminal Secret Empire, and they break up.

Not long after this transformation, Beast is recruited to join the Avengers as a provisional member. He is later granted full Avengers membership and remains a member for many years, becoming a close friend of Wonder Man. He leaves the team periodically to rejoin the X-Men during times of need (such as "The Dark Phoenix Saga"). Beast returns to the Avengers each time, but eventually leaves so that the team, which has a six-member limit at the time, can be filled out by new recruits.

He later joins the Defenders, stays with the team to organize as the "new" Defenders, and is one of the final surviving members at the time of its first disbandment as a result of the battle with Moondragon and the Dragon of the Moon. Beast and fellow surviving Defenders Angel and Iceman are contacted shortly after by Cyclops and Jean Grey to form a new group, X-Factor.

X-Factor
With X-Factor, Beast rejoins the original members of the X-Men, and is again reunited with Vera Cantor. Beast starts out in his furred form, but on their second mission, he is captured by Tower. He is delivered to Carl Maddicks and used in an attempt to develop a cure for mutancy, which has rendered Maddicks' son, Artie, mute. Maddicks develops a serum based on McCoy's original serum, and tests it on Beast. Hank is also subjected to chemotherapy and radiation, and has a cardiac arrest. X-Factor arrives on the scene and saves Hank, but not before he was injected with the serum. When the bandages around his face are removed, he is revealed to have lost his blue fur. This helps in X-Factor's cover as normal humans who are mutant hunters for hire (though they actually help the mutants they capture). When they see the need for their powers, they get new costumes similar to their old X-Men costumes, and call themselves the X-Terminators, posing as renegade mutants. Beast wears a mask as he did originally, since he now looks human again.

Eventually X-Factor clashes with the ancient mutant Apocalypse after Angel loses his wings in a battle and shortly after goes missing. Apocalypse turns Angel into Death, the most powerful of his four Horsemen of Apocalypse. During the battle, Beast is touched by the Horseman Pestilence, whose touch usually causes incredible pain and viral infection. The infection interacts with the recent serum treatment of Maddicks, and instead of killing him, Hank is affected in such a way that every time he uses his superhuman strength, his intelligence decreases. Though the battle is won, it comes at the cost of Hank's decreasing intelligence and Angel's humanity, which would not return for a time. Hank's condition worsens for weeks. He even openly talks to Trish Tilby, a reporter, not realizing she might use the information on TV. Out of respect for Hank's situation, Trish does not mention his name when she reports about X-Factor's recent battles, only that one of them lost his intellect while heroically defending New York. Beast is still hurt by her using the information at all, but she is able to convince him that she meant well.

X-Factor finally ends their charade and are hailed as heroes, and they then don costumes similar to their previous X-Terminator costumes. When Hank's mind is nothing more than that of a child, he intercepts a mutant called Infectia who is trying to kiss Iceman. Infectia has the ability to manipulate molecular structures through touch, creating mutated "monsters". When she kisses Beast, he becomes feverish and begins switching back and forth between his normal and furred forms. Finally, he stabilizes in his furry appearance, keeps his intelligence, and has more strength than ever.

Return to X-Men
Hank soon resumes wearing his old costume, but now no longer has need for a mask. During the events of Inferno, Beast, along with the rest of X-Factor team up with the X-Men and various other heroes to fight the evil forces invading the city; eventually, they manage to stop a portal between Limbo and Earth from remaining open and peace returns for the survivors. Soon after Inferno ends, the X-Tinction Agenda takes place where Genosha wants to punish various mutants for war crimes on their island. Here, Beast plays yet another key role. Shortly after the crisis ends, X-Factor switches costumes once more; Cyclops, Jean, and Iceman all wear identical costumes, while Beast returns to wearing trunks, and Archangel sticks to his old costume he received from Apocalypse.

Towards the end of X-Factor's career, they battle the Shadow King during the Muir Island Saga. The final battle leaves Professor Xavier disabled again, which results in X-Factor rejoining the X-Men.

Studying the Legacy Virus
One of Beast's greatest challenges emerges with Stryfe's fatal Legacy Virus. Hank is already despondent, as he is turning thirty and questions his life accomplishments. His frustrations are further compounded when Professor Xavier and Moira MacTaggert did not ask for his assistance with the Legacy research, but it turns out Xavier is just giving him his privacy. Perusing their data, Hank learns the problem is more difficult than he had initially imagined. Hank has always believed that, given time, he could solve any problem; the Legacy Virus becomes his obsession. He goes as far as making an unethical decision in giving Mister Sinister information on the virus, since he has more resources and fewer morals to inhibit him.

A turning point comes when Dark Beast finishes some of the formula, occasionally prying more information from Hank whom he imprisoned and replaces for a while. The most critical step toward a solution (other than when Beast individually finds the cure without acknowledgement) comes when Dr. MacTaggert discovers Mystique's irresponsible manipulation of virus strains. The cure is incomplete and it takes Beast to design the final cure. Based on Moira's notes, Beast concocts the anti-virus to much elation, but it soon is repaid with a heavy toll—Colossus chooses to sacrifice his life to release the remedy.

After mourning the loss of a teammate, Hank briefly leaves the school with Storm and her X-Treme X-Men team in search of Destiny's diaries. After an attack by Vargas that leaves Psylocke dead, Beast is gravely injured and returns to the institute.

Enhanced feline form
As the world experiences a mutant baby boom, much of the mutant community seemingly begins experiencing "secondary mutations", often taking the form of additional or enhanced abilities. In the aftermath of Vargas' attack, Beast's secondary mutation is "jumpstarted" due to the powers of teammate Sage. The further mutation causes Beast to develop a more feline physique, to which he initially has some trouble adapting. A psychic attack by the genocidal Cassandra Nova leaves Beast humiliated, badly beaten (by the controlled body of his friend Beak) and haunted by the possibility that his new form is simply a step in a continuous state of devolution. Additionally, the alteration in form causes his long-time girlfriend, Trish Tilby, to break up with him after being accused of bestiality in the media. Over time, Beast strikes up a strong friendship with Emma Frost, in one incident bringing her flowers to cheer her up. He finds her diamond form shattered into thousands of pieces and spends some time putting her back together. With a final jolt of psionic energy from Jean Grey, Frost returns to life.

Beast later uncovers what seems to be a female mutant with feline features, like his situation. This raises hopes for him, until he discovers it is not a mutant human that looks like a cat, it is a mutant cat who looks like a human. Either way, the creature is at the limit of her life and Beast allows her to leave the X-Mansion to die quietly in a spot she finds comfortable.

Astonishing X-Men
When news of a "cure" that would reverse mutations suddenly arises, Beast finds himself seriously considering taking it so he can once again appear human. Hank eventually decides against it after vigorous "urging" by fellow team member Wolverine, as it would send out a negative message to other mutants if an X-Man were to take the cure. After learning that the cure was developed by fellow geneticist Kavita Rao through experimentation on mutant corpses—as well as on the revived X-Man Colossus—Beast helps take down Rao's operation. When the villainous Hellfire Club attacks the X-Men, Cassandra Nova telepathically strips away Beast's higher human consciousness, leaving him with only his animal instincts. After he hunts Wolverine around campus (and even eats his leg), a student named Blindfold faces him down with a device he and Xavier had built in case his consciousness was ever lost. The device is a high-powered sensory stimulant in the form of a ball of string, which Beast had alluded to as being his greatest fear. Once restored, he is quick to put on a suit and tie and help Wolverine with a hyper-magnetic device. He, along with his teammates, are taken from the Mansion by the government agency S.W.O.R.D. and airlifted to the alien Breakworld.

Civil War
When a Civil War breaks out among Marvel's superheroes, Beast, along with the other X-Men, assumes a neutral stance. Beast was not a particular fan of the policy and secretly violates his stance by providing Spider-Man with a holographic disguise to enable him to continue teaching at Midtown High after his secret identity has been exposed. Despite his personal feelings about the Superhuman Registration Act, Beast enlists his services to the Initiative program after the war's end, to assist in the training of the next generation of superheroes.

Endangered Species
The X-Men and various other mutants attend the funeral of a young mutant boy named Matt Landru who has been killed in a road traffic accident and muse on what this means for mutant-kind. Beast plans to find a way to reverse M-Day. Despite the 'aid' of his other self (the Dark Beast), along with exploring such diverse avenues of investigation as analysis of alternate timelines or an attempt to track down the Scarlet Witch, he is unsuccessful in his research, but the final part shows him holding a child wearing a three-eyed smiley face shirt saying "Evolution" on it as a promotion of the Messiah Complex.

Messiah CompleX
Beast is shown helping Professor X repair Cerebro when the X-Men are tracking down the child with the X-Gene. Beast is later seen at the Mansion when it is attacked by the Sentinels, who have been taken over by an unknown person. When Iceman arrives at the school with the New X-Men, Beast works with Prodigy and is able to stabilize the mortally wounded Hellion, as well as the other New X-Men and X-Men injured in their battles with the Purifiers and the Marauders, respectively. He is later present during the battle on Muir Island and is among the first to reach Professor Xavier after he is accidentally shot by Bishop. Xavier's body soon disappears.

In the aftermath, Cyclops has sent Beast to search for Professor Xavier, whose status is unknown by the X-Men. Beast is also seen closing down the ruins of the X-Mansion and taking Martha Johansson with him.

Move to San Francisco
Beast is seen as part of the team setting up a new X-Men headquarters in San Francisco, California. He is working closely with Cyclops, Emma Frost, and the rookie X-Man, Armor. He is also still seeing Abigail Brand, who requests that he take a weekend off from the X-Men so that she can 'tamper with him extensively'. He helps Tabitha Smith, teaching the young and flippant woman to use research instead of brutal strength to fight her enemy, a mutant with sedation powers called Nuwa. He and Warren go to Buenos Aires to recruit Doctor Nemesis to help the X-Men save the Mutant race. Only after they stop tube-grown super Nazis, does Nemesis agree. They also recruit Madison Jeffries. Together, they created a time travel device so that they could travel into the future and retrieve the mutant Messiah. However, because they created a device for time travel in so little time, the side-effect of the device is that the user's biology breaks down upon entering the future, so it will automatically bring the person back in thirty-two and a half hours.

Beast discovers that the Super-Skrulls with X-Men abilities can be infected with the Legacy Virus. Despite his ethical protests to the contrary, Cyclops decides to use it on them, offering the antidote in return for the Skrulls' retreat.

The X-Club
To save mutantkind from the effects of M-Day, Beast and Angel had to gather a team of specialists to help them. They gathered Madison Jeffries, Yuriko Takiguchi, and Doctor Nemesis. They then returned to Graymalkin Industries to meet their final member Dr. Kavita Rao (who was formerly trying to cure mutation). Beast and the X-Club traveled back to 1906 to find Doctor Nemesis's parents and discover the origins of modern mutation. During the mission, they also fought an early version of a Sentinel created by the Hellfire Club, and inadvertently caused the San Francisco earthquake. When they returned to the present, they found that their DNA evidence had been buried beneath where the Dreaming Celestial was standing in the park.

Utopia
After being captured, Beast became a test subject for the Omega Machine (designed by Dark Beast to eradicate mutant powers and place them in Weapon Omega) while being held prisoner on Alcatraz Island by Norman Osborn, along with Professor X. Beast is shown getting weaker and mentions losing his claws while hooked up to the machine. Beast was rescued by the X-Men, and later recuperated from his injuries. Later, he spoke at the funeral of Yuriko Takiguchi when Magneto had arrived. Beast seemed increasingly disillusioned with Cyclops' leadership and methods, such as allowing Magneto to become a member to his time under torture under the Dark Beast. This resulted in Beast leaving the X-Men.

S.W.O.R.D.
After leaving the X-Men, Beast opted to join his current girlfriend Agent Abigail Brand as a member of S.W.O.R.D. However, shortly after joining her in space, Brand's co-commander, Henry Peter Gyrich (hired by Norman Osborn) begins to round-up the aliens residing on Earth, in a xenophobic attempt at avoiding another Secret Invasion. As a result of Henry's plan, he has even made moves against Brand, resulting in her, Beast, and the dragon Lockheed, becoming fugitives from S.W.O.R.D. and attempting to overthrow Gyrich.

Second Coming
Beast later returns in an issue of Uncanny X-Men to attend the funeral of his friend and teammate, Kurt Wagner (Nightcrawler) where he confronts Scott Summers and blames Kurt's death on Scott's increasingly militant and extremist attitude to protecting the mutant species at all costs (even at the cost of sacrificing his friends to do so). Despite his issues with Cyclops, Beast remains on Utopia to help deal with the attacks being made by Bastion. Following Bastion's defeat at the hands of Hope Summers, Henry again departs Utopia.

Secret Avengers
Hank appears as part of Steve Rogers' Secret Avengers team. He goes with the covert ops squad on their mission to Mars, and assisted the team in helping Shang-Chi. He also played a crucial part in the capture, interrogation, and "un-brainwashing" of John Steele.

Schism and AvX
After the separation of the X-Men into two teams, Beast is in the team that goes with Wolverine to open The Jean Grey School for Higher Learning in Westchester County, New York.

During the Avengers vs. X-Men mini-series, Beast sides with the Avengers to investigate and stop the Phoenix Force's return to Earth. Hank joins the team of Avengers sent to halt the Phoenix Force's return to Earth, but later temporarily resigns from the Avengers in protest against their efforts to stop the 'Phoenix Five'—the five X-Men who have received the power of the Phoenix Force—as their actions appear to initially be benevolent. He returns to aid the Avengers and the X-Men when Cyclops and Emma Frost begin to be corrupted by the Phoenix's power.

Accelerated Mutation and Time Travel
In the aftermath of the Phoenix War, Cyclops now actively strikes out at government organizations and holds mutants prisoner, with the X-Men unwilling to actively fight him as they fear the subsequent mutant civil war that might result. Beast, who is apparently dying due to side-effects of his secondary artificially-accelerated mutation, stumbles upon a solution after a chance comment from Iceman to the effect that the Cyclops they knew when they were young would not tolerate his present self's actions. Beast travels back in time to the early days of the Xavier Institute to bring the original five X-Men from that period into the future, hoping that Scott's past self will be able to convince his present self to stand down.

Beast lapses into a coma shortly after bringing the team into the present, and Jean's telepathy, which is artificially accelerated by the trauma of her trip to the future and witnessing what Scott has become, manages to connect the minds of the two Hanks. This allows the younger Hank to spot a mistake in his future self's calculations and stabilize his physiology by reverting to a blue-furred ape-like state again where this form is bald and has no head hair aside from the blue fur covering his whole body. The young X-Men decide to stay in the present and become the All-New X-Men, except for Angel, who joins Cyclops' Uncanny X-Men.

Death of X and working with Inhumans
After Cyclops goes to Muir Island and discovers that all of the mutants died painful deaths, he calls Beast to do a diagnosis and Beast discovers that somehow that the Terrigen cloud, the substance that gives Inhumans their powers, has become toxic towards mutants after mixing with the atmosphere changed its structure. Hoping to bridge Inhuman and Mutant relations in light of this new conflict, Beast works with the Inhumans to find a way to make the Terrigen cloud safe for mutants while making sure it remains suitable for Inhuman powers. He becomes a trusted ally to the Inhumans and joins their counsel.

Inhumans vs X-Men
When the present Beast realizes that he cannot find a cure for the Terrigen cloud, he visits the rest of the mutants and advises them that the best course of action is for all mutants to leave Earth, but his teammates object and imprison him before he can warn the Inhumans that war is coming. However, after learning what the cloud will do to mutants, Medusa activates a generator to destroy the Terrigen cloud, leaving Emma to be branded a traitor for her false claims inform about Cyclops's true death to manipulate the X-Men into destroying the Inhumans. Havok helps Emma to escape for the sake of his brother's memory, while Beast and his remaining teammates make up, all regretting what their lives have come to ever since discovering that the Terrigen could kill them.

Residing on Krakoa

During the "Empyre" storyline, Magik brings Opal of Hordeculture to Krakoa and gives her to Beast so that they can work on a potion containing the toxic material from the black walnut tree. Beast and Opal succeed in making the formula. Using Hordeculture's technology, Beast revives Explodey Boy so that he can confront his zombie counterpart.

Powers and abilities
It is possible that Beast's mutation is a result of genetic atavism. However, he also possesses neotenous characteristics, which may explain him having a genius-level intellect despite his animal physique. He also possesses superhuman strength, speed and agility. He is an excellent hand-to-hand combatant, employing a unique style of acrobatic combat, from combat training he received at Professor Xavier's and coaching from Captain America.

Anthropoid/Simian physique
Originally, Hank McCoy retains the basic features of a normal human alongside a generally simian physiology (e.g., elongated limbs and enlarged extremities) equivalent to that of a Great Ape. This mutation gives him superhuman strength, speed, reflexes, agility, flexibility, dexterity, coordination, balance, and endurance. Hank is equally dexterous with all four limbs; able to perform tasks with his feet or hands with equal ease. Because of his talents and training, Beast can outperform any Olympic-level athlete, contorting his body and performing aerial feats gracefully. His strength and dexterity allow him to climb vertical surfaces with just his hands and/or feet, jump great distances and survive falls that would kill any ordinary person. He also possesses enhanced senses and can track people for great distances over open terrain and his feet are sensitive enough to detect electronic signals (from bombs, listening devices, etc.) through solid walls and floors. Later, he drank an experimental solution of his own making and mutated further through the growth of grey fur covering his entire body and the enhancement of all of his existing abilities, especially his strength, and Hank also gained a nearly instantaneous healing factor. The psychological impact of this first transformation caused Beast to experience short-term amnesia and also made it difficult for him to control his animalistic instincts, which would cause him to slip into an uncontrollable berserker rage during combat. However, his body suddenly mutated again after a short time, changing his fur color from grey to black (although comic book printing technology depicted it as blue), returning his strength to previous levels, and losing his healing factor. He was also able to more easily control his animal instincts after this second mutation. Beast gained the ability to emit mood altering pheromones, causing sexual attraction in women. Hank McCoy briefly returned to his human form with his hair color now being depicted as black, not reddish brown. During this time he was occasionally depicted with claws and fangs, but these were not a part of his original mutation. However, as a result of being touched by Pestilence his strength began to increase exponentially while his intellect began to decrease.

After Infectia's kiss restored Hank to his simian physique, his intellect had stabilized and returned to his previous genius-level, and his strength had increased to superhuman proportions. Beast's fangs and claws became a consistent part of his appearance after this return to his "blue and furry" form.

Beast would later be stabilized to a more human/ape-like form with pointy ears, fangs, and no hair except for the fur on his head.

Feline physique
After being critically wounded, Hank's body undergoes a secondary mutation, jump started by Sage. The result is a more feline appearance equivalent to that of a big cat with a cat-like head and feet. His strength, speed, stamina, sturdiness, and senses increase further with this change. He gains catlike agility, flexibility, coordination, and balance, and all his senses are enhanced to twenty times that of a normal human being. In addition, Beast develops an accelerated healing factor that allows him to repair mild to moderate injuries within the span of a few hours. However, as his hands and feet change from simian to feline (going from a normal human set of four fingers to just three, retaining the opposable thumb), he loses his superhuman dexterity, once admitting that he used to play the guitar, but is now learning to play the drums instead. Following the X-Men's relocation to San Francisco, Beast discovers that he had regained some of his old manual dexterity. In the first issue of Warren Ellis' Astonishing X-Men run, Beast also comments he no longer needs full sleep.

It is later discovered that his secondary feline mutation is still detrimental to his health: as such, with the combined efforts of past versions of Jean Grey and himself, Beast's condition was stabilized in a more human/ape-like form, possessing blue fur and larger than the average human male but otherwise fairly human.

Genius-level intellect
Hank possesses a brilliant intellect. He is a world-renowned biochemist, having earned PhDs in Biophysics and Genetics, and is the man who cured the Legacy Virus. He frequently functions as both field medic and in-house physician for the X-Men, despite not technically having a medical degree. His intelligence and expertise in genetics rival that of Professor X, Moira MacTaggert, and Kavita Rao. Despite this, he has never received a Nobel Prize or been elected to the United States National Academy of Sciences. A Renaissance man, McCoy is well versed in many fields including linguistics (fluent in English, German, French, Latin, Spanish, Japanese, Arabic, and Russian as well as the fictional language Latverian), literature, philosophy, psychology, sociology, history, art and art history, anthropology, music, political science and economics with a special affinity for science and technology and a penchant for quoting literary classics including Shakespeare's plays. His vast scientific knowledge ranges from theoretical physics, quantum mechanics, differential equations, nanotechnology, anatomy, biomedicine, analytical chemistry, electrical engineering, and mechanical engineering to the construction of a hyper-magnetic device. An electronics expert, he often repairs Cerebro and makes upgrades to the Danger Room settings. He has made several deus ex machina devices on par with Reed Richards, including a device that strips entities of cosmic powers. While not a medical doctor, he was able to perform brain surgery on the Red Skull to extract the fragment of Charles Xavier's brain that the Skull had grafted onto himself, removing the Skull's telepathic abilities while leaving the villain otherwise apparently healthy.

Time-displaced Beast's abilities
After a meeting with Doctor Strange, the displaced younger Beast has mastered a combination of science and magic, allowing him to return himself and his four teammates to the past for a few minutes, although he notes that it took a great deal of effort to send them back for that long and it merely confirmed that history has been 'reset' so that the displaced X-Men are no longer 'needed' in the past. He has also mastered a mystical portal that allowed him to send the Juggernaut to Siberia after passing through Hell.

Similarities
According to writer Will Murray, a possible inspiration for the Beast was Andrew Blodgett "Monk" Mayfair, a companion of pulp hero Doc Savage. Both are possessed of an apelike appearance and are brilliant scientists. Before becoming more erudite in later issues, McCoy also used a great deal of slang in his early appearances much like Monk.

Other versions

Time-displaced Beast

All-New X-Men
The younger Hank and All-New X-Men defect to Cyclops's school, after the events of the Battle of the Atom unfold. Young Hank is later transported to the Ultimate Marvel universe, where he is captured by that world's version of Doctor Doom, then teams up with the Guardians of the Galaxy in finding the Black Vortex.

The time-displaced Jean Grey accidentally reads the mind of the present Beast and finds out that he regrets never telling her his true feeling. Jean then confronts the time-displaced Hank and gives him a kiss. They do not have time to develop their relationship since Dr. Octopus attacks them in New York City,

Introduction to magic
Following the reconstruction of reality after the Battleworld crisis, the displaced X-Men remain in the future, travelling the world as they try to find their place, while the 'present' Beast works with the Inhumans to find a means of resolving the recent release of Terrigenesis crystals that have proven dangerous to mutants. Increasingly frustrated with his inability to find a way back to their time through science, the young Beast contacts Doctor Strange for advice on using magic, but although Strange cannot help due to his currently weakened powers, when Hank is able to help him find a solution to a dimensional rift he was investigating, Strange reassures Hank that he is smart enough to find a solution to the current dilemma. After the conflict with the Inhumans is concluded, the younger Beast reveals to his teammates that he has determined, through a combination of science and magic, that the younger X-Men cannot return to the past as they are already there, leaving them free to travel the world and find their own place.

RessurXion
The young Beast finds himself working alongside Magneto along with the rest of the time-displaced X-Men doing whatever it takes to preserve Xavier's dream. Beast begins to use magic more freely on their missions, something that greatly distresses Cyclops. Whenever they are at X-Men HQ Beast spends most of his time on his own to continue study magic and becomes increasingly reclusive in the process.

1602
In Marvel 1602, Beast is known as Hal McCoy and retains his original appearance of a human with lengthy arms and legs and enormous hands and feet. He is well spoken and eloquent, and a member of Carlos Javier's (Professor X) group of "witchbreeds", though he tends to not give others a chance to speak when he is talking. When several soldiers stare at him, he glowers and attributes his appearance to his origin as an Orkneyman. He also tells of his mother's humiliation when he was born, her cruel neighbours having suggested that Hal's father was an ape.

He reappears in Spider-Man 1602. Between the two appearances he was working with Henri Le Pym, a natural philosopher employed by Baron Octavius to create a potion that will counteract the effects an octopus based serum have had on his physiology. Testing some of the potions on himself, Hal becomes more bestial in appearance. When he first appears in Spider-Man 1602 #1, he is imprisoned in Le Pym's laboratory, treated as a source of mutagenic blood rather than a fellow scientist.

He is not shown clearly until he is released from the cage by Peter Parquagh in #3. He resembles a gorilla to a greater extent than the main universe Beast, with only a slight blue tinge to his fur.

Age of Apocalypse

Dark Beast, sometimes known as the Black Beast, is a Marvel Comics supervillain, an evil alternative reality version of the main universe's X-Men's Beast.

Deadpool Corps
In the second issue of 'Prelude to Deadpool Corps". Deadpool visits a world where Prof. X runs a school for troubled kids. There Beast is a teacher and sends child versions of Cyclops and Deadpool to see Storm for causing trouble in class.

Exiles
A version of Beast from Earth-763 is drafted onto the superhero team the Exiles. Beast-763 is far more brutish in appearance, including a long tail and strongly protruding canine teeth. He was seemingly killed while fighting MODOK, but was in fact taken to join the Exiles. It was revealed that this version of Beast lost most of his intelligence due to his mutation, however he regained his mind after he was briefly connected to the Crystal Palace. Also this version of Beast was in a romantic relationship with Wonder-Man. At the end if the series, Beast was given the option to return to his home, but seeing that Wonder-Man was killed in battle shortly after, decided he had nothing to go back to and remained with the team.

Versions seen in Endangered Species
During the "Endangered Species" storyline after House of M, Beast tried to ask Doctor Strange for help fixing the problem. Dr. Strange not only demonstrated that he could not help, but showed Beast a number of alternative reality versions of him who were facing equal failure, including but not limited to: a version of Beast in the raiment of a Catholic hierarch, a red-furred gun-toting version seeking a cure with Bishop, a version with a cyborg arm, a wheelchair-using version using a synthesis of magic and technology, a version who looked like Beast's original human form, and a caped Beast in a snowy landscape.

Here Comes Tomorrow
In the "Here Comes Tomorrow" story arc (set 150 years in the X-Men's future), Beast takes on the role of Headmaster of the Xavier Institute after the death of Jean Grey and the retirement of Charles Xavier and Scott Summers. Unable to cope with the pressures of this position and trying to find a cure for the looming extinction of the human race, Beast turns to the power-enhancing drug Kick. Unbeknownst to him, Kick is an aerosol form of an entity known as Sublime. Sublime takes over Beast's body, relegating him to a passenger in his own form. 150 years after the death of Jean Grey, Sublime is finally purged from the aged, white-furred Beast, who is seconds later beheaded by Sublime's champion Appolyon.

House of M
In the House of M reality, Beast appears as a scientist working alongside Hank Pym and Forge, all of whom work for Tony Stark. Here, he retains his human appearance similar to when he first joined X-Men. Beast assumes he is superior to humans, simply because of his mutations.

Marvel Noir
In X-Men Noir, Hank McCoy is a member of the X-Men, a band of young, sociopathic criminals. Like his mainstream counterpart, McCoy is physically imposing as well as an avid student, though he has a penchant for employing obscure words in an inaccurate way.

Marvel Zombies
It appears that Beast, along with the other not-yet infected X-Men, battling the zombified Alpha Flight, in Marvel Zombies: Dead Days. However he has been unexpectedly infected by a squad of zombies, and he next returns as a zombie.

He also appears in Marvel Zombies vs. The Army Of Darkness, Beast works with Reed Richards to rewire Cerebro to detect humans. Many are detected at Doctor Doom's castle and Beast participates in the multi-zombie attack upon it and somehow both found a sizeable stash of meat, which ironically pleases the other zombies.

Beast is later shown arguing with Colonel America when the Colonel is vigorously explaining to him how things work. However, he is slain by the Colonel's newly granted 'cosmic powers' when he accidentally blasts off his head.

X-Men: Misfits
Beast is portrayed as always in a blue bear humanoid like form with a short tail, he wears glasses and a tie with the X-Men symbol on it. He is a professor at the school, and is strangely never referred to as Hank or Beast by name in the story.

Mutant X
In this universe, Hank McCoy is a member of the Six, a team of mutant heroes led by Havok. Instead of a furry simian-like form, McCoy's experiments mutated him into a green, amphibious form with childlike intelligence, codenamed the Brute. As well as having his usual acrobatic and athletic ability, Hank has webbed extremities and can breathe underwater. He becomes further mutated during the Inferno crisis, when he makes a deal with the demons S'ym and N'astirh. This mutation gives him hooves instead of feet.

When the Goblyn Queen first ascends to power, she brainwashes the Brute into serving her purpose. Scotty Summers, the child of Havok and the Goblyn Queen, unknowingly frees the Brute from her control. After the Goblyn Queen is defeated, the Brute chooses to remain with the Six.

Later, Brute jumps in front of a psychic blast from Professor X that was meant for Havok. This has the unexpected effect of restoring his intellect, and the Brute tries to find a way to return Havok to his reality, to cure Bloodstorm and Gambit of their vampirism, and to restore Ice-Man. Brute succeeds in all, but Havok opts not to return to the main Marvel Universe. The Brute's intelligence is lost again as the after-effects of Xavier's blast wear off.

Brutes stays with the team until the series ends. He is seriously injured by Dracula during the finale issue, thus his ultimate fate is left uncertain.

New Exiles
After the New Exiles land on the world of warring empires, they encounter Dame Emma Frost, head of Britain's Department X and founder of Force-X. This team include Hank McCoy, a more feline version of Beast who is codenamed Puma.

Shadow-X
New Excalibur battles an evil counterpart of the Beast who is a member of the Shadow-X, the X-Men of an alternative reality in which Professor X was possessed by the Shadow King. They are brought to Earth-616 as a result of M-Day. This version of Beast, never having been free to fiddle around with his mutation, retained the more human appearance he had in the Original X-Men. He was later killed by Sage.

Star Trek crossover
One notable crossover in which Beast appeared was the Star Trek/X-Men crossover, in which the X-Men traveled to the 23rd Century to team up with the original crew of the U.S.S. Enterprise. During the encounter, Beast met his Star Trek counterpart, Dr. Leonard McCoy. (When a nurse calls out, "Dr. McCoy!" both Beast and Dr. Leonard McCoy answer, "What?") The story also featured Beast teaming up with Mr. Spock to stop an inter-dimensional rift caused by the villain Proteus. In a one-page drawing included at the end of the issue, we see Beast and Mr. Spock engaged in a game of chess, with Beast intently studying the chessboard while hanging upside-down from the ceiling.

Ultimate Marvel
Henry "Hank" McCoy was not born like a 'blue ape'. He was born with hands instead of feet, he tried to make a substance that would cure his mutation but instead it only made it worse. With his own parents denouncing him throughout his childhood for his genetic status, he chooses to hide his immense intelligence to avoid further complications. Hank becomes a founding member of the Ultimate X-Men taking the codename Beast. He also takes on the role of the team's elite engineer, frequently upgrading the X-Men's Blackbird X-Jet and Danger Room sequences.

When the team is kidnapped by Weapon X, they operate on him, causing him to take on his blue furry appearance and gain additional, strengthened senses, such as smell and hearing.

Beast begins an on again/off again relationship with Storm. Storm loves him because of his intelligence, but Beast's inferiority complex often gets in the way of their relationship. He becomes convinced that Storm only loves him because Professor X is using mind control on her. Beast starts an online relationship that eventually leads to the Ultimate War debacle, when he lets it slip that Magneto is still alive (the supposed mutant "supermodel" Naomi he is chatting with is actually the Blob fishing for information).

Beast is killed after being crushed under the rubble of a Sentinel attack. While his death is felt by all of the X-Men, it has had the greatest impact upon Storm. However, it is revealed that the Beast is revived at the hospital. Xavier and Nick Fury keep his survival a secret, Xavier making Beast believe he is regularly visiting his family and the X-Men to keep him occupied. Having reversed himself back to his normal human appearance (maintaining the blue hair from his former kangaroo kidney transplant, which was independent of Weapon X's modifications), Hank is now working on a cure to a "Legacy Virus", created by an anti-mutant government conspiracy led by Admiral Stryker, that threatens mutants. The apparent death of Xavier (actually time travel) breaks the mental holds on him so he knows that everyone thinks he is dead and is not happy being forced to work for S.H.I.E.L.D. Beast escapes S.H.I.E.L.D. custody and heads towards Xavier's Institute. He later rescues Pyro, and shocks his former teammates by revealing that he is still alive. After being proved to be the real Beast by Psylocke and Wolverine, he is allowed to join Bishop's new X-Men and continues his relationship with Storm. After Bishop's death, Xavier is revealed to be alive and Beast returns to his life at the Xavier Institute.

In Issue #1 of Ultimatum, Beast, among Dazzler, Angel and Nightcrawler are overwhelmed in Magneto's flooding of New York (via Thor's hammer). Angel survives the flood and recovers the bodies of Dazzler and Beast, who drowned. Scott cannot believe that "that size 16-wearing dweeb" would borrow his best tie and then die with it on.

Hank has a genius level IQ. His mutation grants him a simian physiology with superhuman strength, speed, stamina, reflexes, agility, flexibility, coordination, balance, and manual and pedal dexterity so great he can write with all his hands and feet at once and tie knots equally well with both his fingers and toes. The Weapon X program mutates Hank further, causing him to evolve into a more animalistic form with claws, fangs, pointed ears, enhanced senses, and thick, blue fur covering his entire body. Since then, he is like this continuously throughout the comics until his own modifications are made.

What If?
An issue of What If? asked "What If Beast Had Truly Become a Beast." As Hank McCoy has isolated a catalyst for a mutation in a hormone extract, industrial spies attacked and he drank the extract. He then turned into a beast when the catalyst was too well concentrated. As he escaped into the night looking for meat, Professor X telepathically contacted Beast to ask if he was OK. Beast savagely responded that he was no longer an X-Man and refused to accept his help. Professor X sent the X-Men to retrieve him before any harm can come to people. Beast managed to take Angel down before being scared away by Jean's telepathic scream. When Jean Grey and Cyclops caught up with him, Beast attacked, throwing rocks at them. With his optic beam, Cyclops destroyed most of the stones but one is able to knock out Jean Grey. When Beast was about to claim Jean as a meal, Professor X used his telepathy to calm Beast down. In his final human words, Beast told Professor X not to let him become an animal. To keep humans safe from him, the X-Men released Beast into the Savage Land where he became Ka-Zar and Zabu's hunting companion.

Beast appears in the What If? story "What If the X-Men Died on their First Mission?" as the leader of a newly formed X-Men team following his former teammates' demise on Krakoa, consisting of Theresa Cassidy (who named herself Banshee in honor of her late father), Rahne Sinclair, Namorita, and James Proudstar, the brother of the original Thunderbird.

X-Men Fairy Tales
Beast appears as the monkey,  (Japanese for blue). Aoi appears younger and more monkey-like than the 616 version of Beast, although he retains his blue fur. Unlike the studious and intellectual Beast, Aoi is playful and mischievous. After being outwitted, Aoi joins Hitome (Cyclops). He also shows an ability to change into a larger stronger form.

X-Men: Forever
In this alternative reality (with a history identical to 616) that begins after Chris Claremont's X-Men 1–3, Beast retains his blue-furred ape-like appearance, and is the X-Men's chief-scientist. Beast is responsible for checking for blood-work of two Storms (one who is an evil adult and the other who is a teenager) and discovers that they are identical. After the death of Logan, who Jean was having an affair with behind Cyclops' back, Beast becomes Jean's closest friend and confidant, trying to help her over-come her loss, and her newly re-awakened Phoenix power. Recently, Jean has admitted to knowing about Hank's long-time crush on her, and the two begin a relationship.

Deadpool Kills the Marvel Universe
In the limited series Deadpool Kills the Marvel Universe, Wolverine encounters Deadpool who has killed Beast and turned his pelt into a cloak.

Old Man Logan
In the "Old Man Logan" storyline, Beast is among the X-Men who perish at the hands of Wolverine when he is tricked by Mysterio into believing his friends are super-villains attacking the mansion.

Battle of the Atom
In the possible future witnessed in Battle of the Atom, Beast has mutated further, with one side of his head notably more feral than the other, including a horn. He has also defected to the Brotherhood, having apparently become disillusioned with the X-Men's goal while blaming himself for causing some unspecified catastrophe by bringing his past self into the present. He is apparently killed in the final confrontation between the various time-displaced X-Men teams, with the past and present Hank vowing that they will never accept that they become what they have just witnessed. However, he later appears alive during the future Brotherhood's new attack on Cyclops' base, during which the X-Men discover that the entire Brotherhood (With the exception of Raze, the son of Wolverine and Mystique) were under the control of Charles Xavier II (The apparent son of Xavier and Mystique), with Hank's future self being allowed just enough freedom to be horrified at what Xavier II was making him do as the telepath blames the X-Men for failing to live up to Charles Xavier's dream. At the conclusion of the fight, Hank and others are freed from Xavier II's control and allowed to return to their home time, with Hank still blaming himself for some past mistake but committed to making up for it by returning to the X-Men.

In other media

Television
 Beast makes his first animated appearance on a 1966 The Marvel Super Heroes episode of The Sub-Mariner, with the original X-Men line-up (Angel, Cyclops, Iceman, and Jean Grey).
 Beast makes a non-speaking appearance in a flashback in the Spider-Man and His Amazing Friends episode "The Origin of Iceman".
 Beast is a regular character and member of the X-Men in X-Men, voiced by George Buza. He appears in his blue simian form throughout the entire series. Buza also voiced Beast in the two-part episode "The Mutant Agenda"/"Mutant's Revenge" of Spider-Man.
 Beast appears as a regular character beginning in the second season of X-Men: Evolution, voiced by Michael Kopsa. He starts off as the chemistry and gym teacher of the high school the younger X-Men attend, suppressing his mutation through a serum he developed. The serum starts to fail when he starts getting aggressive and he eventually mutates into the furry blue "Beast" with ape-like arms and feet. After Professor X and Spyke get through to Hank, he joins the X-Men.
 Beast appears in Wolverine and the X-Men, voiced by Fred Tatasciore. This version is shown in his blue simian form. He is the first X-Man recruited by Wolverine in the series, being the only X-Man to have stayed behind after the destruction of the X-Mansion and the disappearances of Professor X and Jean Grey.
 Beast appears in the Astonishing X-Men motion comic, voiced by Mike Pollock and later Ron Halder.
 Beast appears in Marvel Anime: X-Men voiced by Hideyuki Tanaka in the Japanese version and reprised by Fred Tatasciore in the English dub. This version is shown in his blue feline form.
 Beast appears in the first episode of Marvel Disk Wars: The Avengers, voiced by Naomi Kusumi in the Japanese version and Dave Wittenberg in the English version.

Film
 Beast was included in early drafts for the 2000 film X-Men, but had to be removed for the film to be greenlit by the studio, due to budget concerns. Elements of his persona, including his medical expertise and political activism, were transferred into Jean Grey's character.
 Steve Bacic makes a brief cameo as Dr. Hank McCoy in the 2003 film X2, on a television screen in a bar.
 Kelsey Grammer portrays Beast in the 2006 film X-Men: The Last Stand. In the film, Beast is a member of the cabinet of the President of the United States, serving as Secretary of Mutant Affairs. After a "cure" for human mutation is developed and weaponized, he resigns from his position in the government and helps the X-Men fight Magneto's forces on Alcatraz Island. He ultimately injects Magneto with the cure. After the incident, he is appointed United States Ambassador to the United Nations.
 Nicholas Hoult portrays a younger Beast in the 2011 prequel film X-Men: First Class. Actor Benjamin Walker was originally cast in the role, but dropped out of the film to star in the Broadway musical Bloody Bloody Andrew Jackson. McCoy's most notable character facet in the franchise from this point on is his long-lasting crush on Mystique. In the film, he originally possesses only prehensile feet and enhanced speed, agility and reflexes. He attempts to cure himself of his mutation with a serum derived from Mystique's DNA, but this causes his transformation into his familiar blue-furred feline form.
 Hoult and Grammer returned as Beast in the 2014 film X-Men: Days of Future Past. Hoult revealed to JoBlo that Hank created a serum which controls his mutation, making him appear human unless he gets angry. Grammer reprised his role as the older Beast in a cameo at the end of the film. When asked by the younger Beast if he is alive in the future, Wolverine tells him that he is not. A viral marketing website for the film shows that Beast was killed in 2015 by an angry mob of human protesters outside his home in upstate New York. Wolverine's actions in the past— during which he interacted with the younger Beast and warned him and Xavier about the future— create a new timeline where Beast is alive, with Wolverine seeing the older Beast walking through the Xavier Mansion when he returns to the future.
 Hoult reprised his role as Beast in the 2016 film X-Men: Apocalypse. Still using his serum to maintain his human form, Hank has also developed a new jet in the mansion's basement, respecting Xavier's dream to make the mansion a full university for mutants and humans but preparing for war nevertheless. He reverts to his "beast" form after the mansion is destroyed in the first confrontation with Apocalypse when he is captured by Stryker and thus misses his shot, but subsequently pilots a jet stolen from Stryker's own fleet to Cairo to confront Apocalypse, engaging the Horseman Psylocke in battle, with her telekinetic-enhanced leaps and her mental sword matched by his greater physical strength and reflexes. At the film's conclusion, Beast is depicted as one of Xavier's lieutenants (along with Mystique) with the revived X-Men team.
Hoult portrays the character in a brief cameo in Deadpool 2. While Deadpool is in the X-Mansion and rants about how vacant it seems, Beast and other X-Men are briefly shown behind a sliding wooden door, which is quietly closed by Beast in an attempt to hide from Deadpool.
 Hoult reprises his role as Beast in the 2019 film Dark Phoenix. When Jean Grey's powers escalate to a level where she becomes dangerous to her allies, she accidentally kills Raven in an outburst, leaving Hank angry at Xavier's attempt to control the team and prompting him to turn to Erik to help him kill Jean. However, after Jean is revealed to be under attack by an alien intelligence seeking her power, Hank and Erik work with the X-Men to fight off the aliens, allowing Jean time to regain control of herself. Xavier subsequently leaves Hank in charge of the school and the X-Men while he takes a leave of absence. 
 There was a planned Beast spin-off movie in development with Hoult reprising his role before being cancelled.

Video games
 Beast appears in the 1994 Super Nintendo side-scrolling video game X-Men: Mutant Apocalypse as a playable character.
 Beast also appears as a playable character in the 1995 Sega Genesis side-scrolling game X-Men 2: Clone Wars.
 Beast makes a cameo appearance in Chun-Li's ending in the 1996 fighting game X-Men vs. Street Fighter.
 Beast makes a cameo appearance alongside Blanka in the Death Valley stage in the 1997 fighting game Marvel Super Heroes vs. Street Fighter.
 Beast is a playable character in the 2000 fighting game X-Men: Mutant Academy and the 2001 sequel game X-Men: Mutant Academy 2. He is again playable in the 2002 fighting game X-Men: Next Dimension.
 Beast appears as an NPC in the first level of the 2001 game Spider-Man 2: Enter Electro, voiced by Dee Bradley Baker.
 Beast appears as an NPC in the 2003 movie tie-in game X2: Wolverine's Revenge, voiced by Richard Portnow. He gives Wolverine a watch which tells him how much time he has left to cure himself from an ailment. He also synthesizes part of the serum to said ailment midway through the game.
 Beast is a playable character in the 2004 action role-playing game X-Men Legends, voiced by Richard Doyle. The player can tour his lab when not on a mission.
 Beast appears as an NPC and boss in the 2005 sequel game X-Men Legends II: Rise of Apocalypse, with Richard Doyle again voicing the character. In the game, Beast is captured by Apocalypse and mind-controlled into being Dark Beast.
 Beast is featured in the 2006 movie tie-in game X-Men: The Official Game (which occurs between X2: X-Men United and X-Men: The Last Stand), voiced by Gregg Berger. He appears multiple times throughout the game.
 Beast is a playable character in Marvel Super Hero Squad Online.
 Beast is a playable character in the Facebook game Marvel: Avengers Alliance. In the game's Special Operations 16, he is captured by Mister Sinister to serve as Pestilence, one of Apocalypse's Horsemen. He is returned to normal once Apocalypse and all the Horsemen are defeated.
 Beast appears as a playable character in Lego Marvel Super Heroes, voiced by Fred Tatasciore.
 Beast appears as an NPC and a playable character in Marvel Heroes, also voiced by Fred Tatasciore. 
 Beast appears as a playable character in the mobile game Marvel Contest of Champions.
 Beast is a playable character in Marvel: Future Fight.
 Beast appears as a playable character in Marvel Puzzle Quest.
 Beast appears as an NPC in Marvel Ultimate Alliance 3: The Black Order, voiced by Fred Tatasciore.
 Beast appears as a playable character in MOBA game Marvel Super War. His role is assassin with easy difficulty.

Toys
Figures of Beast have been released in multiple action figure lines, including Toy Biz's X-Men Classics line, the Marvel Legends line from Toy Biz and later Hasbro, and the Marvel Icons  action figure line. Beast is the sixteenth figurine in the Classic Marvel Figurine Collection. The Beast has also appeared in Hasbro's Marvel Universe Infinite Series line.

Print
In the Marvel magazine, Marvel Vision, for most of the series Beast was the supposed author of his self-titled "Beast Files". This series of two-page articles was perhaps the first time a character in any comic universe was depicted to be keeping detailed profiles on other heroes and villains. This format has been adopted since by many other books, including most notably the Alex Ross DC Comics series Justice, which had two profiles in each issue during the mini-series' 12-issue run. The files appeared for over two years, and the column was voted the fan favorite. "Beast Files" was actually written by Benny R. Powell.

Reception
Beast has received positive reception as a comic book character and a member of the X-Men. Wizard magazine ranked Beast the 180th-greatest comic book character of all time, on their list of the Top 200 Comic Book Characters of All Time. IGN ranked Beast as the 58th-greatest comic book hero of all time stating that Beast embodies everything about the mutant struggle in the Marvel Universe. IGN also ranked Beast as the 9th-greatest X-Men member stating that when the world can accept Henry McCoy, the X-Men will have succeeded in their mission, as #7 in their list of "The Top 50 Avengers" in 2012.

 In 2014, Entertainment Weekly ranked Beast 7th in their "Let's rank every X-Man ever" list.

Collected editions

References

Avengers (comics) characters
Characters created by Jack Kirby
Characters created by Stan Lee
Comics characters introduced in 1963
Fictional characters from Illinois
Fictional characters with slowed ageing
Fictional characters with superhuman durability or invulnerability
Fictional geneticists
Fictional human rights activists
Fictional physicians
Fictional polyglots
Fictional schoolteachers
Male characters in film
Marvel Comics characters who can move at superhuman speeds
Marvel Comics characters with accelerated healing
Marvel Comics characters with superhuman senses
Marvel Comics characters with superhuman strength
Marvel Comics film characters
Marvel Comics male superheroes
Marvel Comics martial artists
Marvel Comics mutants
Marvel Comics scientists
X-Factor (comics)
X-Men members